= Rozzzqween =

British singer and songwriter

ROZZZQWEEN
- Born: Roselyn Mugabe
- Origin: Birmingham, England
- Genres: Contemporary R&B, Soul
- Occupations: Singer, songwriter
- Years active: 2019–present
- Label: Independent

Roselyn Mugabe, professionally known as ROZZZQWEEN, is a British contemporary R&B and soul singer and songwriter from Birmingham, England, based in London.

== Career ==
ROZZZQWEEN began developing her musical career independently, blending elements of contemporary R&B and soul. She has cited artists including Erykah Badu, Amy Winehouse, and Billie Holiday among her influences.

In 2022, she released the single "Lost 4 Wordz", which received coverage from music publications.

She later performed at the Southbank Centre as part of the Futuretense series. Her single "Family Ties" was featured in Billboard's R&B/Hip-Hop Fresh Picks selection.

== Musical style ==
ROZZZQWEEN's music combines contemporary R&B, soul and jazz influences. Critics have highlighted her vocal delivery and emotionally driven songwriting.

== Discography ==
=== EPs ===
- Indescretions of My Youth (2019)
- Damned If We Don't (2021)

=== Selected singles ===
- "Matilda"
- "Lost 4 Wordz" (2022)
- "Who Are These Men" (2024)
- "MLK." (2025)
- "When In Rome" (2025)
- "Family Ties" (2025)
- "Mr Drummer" (2026)
